Facundo Ariel Silva Scheeffer (born 4 July 1996) is a Uruguayan professional footballer who plays as a goalkeeper for C.S.D. Villa Española.

Club career
Silva's career started with Danubio. He was promoted into the club's first-team for the 2014–15 campaign, he failed to make an appearance but was an unused substitute fifteen times as Danubio placed 4th overall. He was unused another nineteen times throughout 2015–16, but Silva did eventually make his professional debut during a 2–1 defeat to Sud América on 19 March 2016. In January 2017, Silva joined Segunda División team Canadian on loan. He featured seventeen times as Canadian were relegated to the Segunda División Amateur. Back with Danubio, Silva appeared in nine games across 2018.

In March 2020, after no more appearances for Danubio, Silva was loaned to second tier team Villa Española. His debut arrived, belatedly due to the COVID-19 pandemic, in August against Albion.

International career
Silva has represented Uruguay at U15 and U17 level. He won fifteen caps for the U17s, including his debut in a friendly against Paraguay in May 2012 and one appearance at the 2013 South American Under-17 Football Championship in Argentina; playing the full ninety minutes in a 5–1 first stage victory over Bolivia. He was a substitute for the U17s' other eight U17 Championship fixtures, as well as for five games at the subsequent 2013 FIFA U-17 World Cup in the United Arab Emirates.

Career statistics
.

References

External links

1996 births
Living people
People from Artigas, Uruguay
Uruguayan footballers
Uruguay youth international footballers
Association football goalkeepers
Uruguayan Primera División players
Uruguayan Segunda División players
Danubio F.C. players
Canadian Soccer Club players
Villa Española players